You Can't Hurry Love is a 1988 American romantic comedy film written and directed by Richard Martini and starring David Leisure, Scott McGinnis, Anthony Geary, and Bridget Fonda. A man moves to Los Angeles and hears that "the only way to be successful in Los Angeles is to pretend to be someone else."  He goes on a series of video dates and learns that everyone he meets is pretending to be someone else except for the girl who works at the dating service; he realizes the only way to find love is to be himself.

Plot

Eddie Hayes is a newcomer to Los Angeles who seeks to take a job to re-start his life after a failed relationship in his Ohio home town. His slacker cousin, Skip, sets him up with a job interview at an advertising company, headed by the eccentric Peter Newcomb, who instead hooks Eddie up with his punk half-brother, Tony, at a beachside surfboard shop in handing out flyers. Eddie meets a potential new girlfriend, named Peggy Kellogg, who works for a dating service which Eddie decides to moonlight as a director of interview videos for the dating service to be close to Peggy. Eddie soon puts himself in front of the camera to try to pick up a potential girlfriend for himself to settle down with. As he goes on a series of disastrous blind dates with various women, each one stranger than the last one, will Eddie ever hook up with Peggy despite the fact that she has a boyfriend, and engaged?

Cast
 David Leisure - Peter Newcomb
 Scott McGinnis - Skip
 Anthony Geary - Tony
 Bridget Fonda - Peggy Kellogg
 Frank Bonner - Chuck Hayes
 Lu Leonard - Miss Frigget
 Merete Van Kamp - Monique
 David Packer - Eddie Hayes
 Charles Grodin - Mr. Glerman
 Sally Kellerman - Kelly Bones
 Kristy McNichol - Rhonda
 Luana Anders - Macie Hayes
 Jake Steinfeld - Sparky
 Judy Balduzzi - Glenda
 Danitza Kingsley - Tracey

Home media
The film has been released on DVD by Lions Gate Home Entertainment as a double feature with Love Hurts.

External links

Notes

1988 films
1988 romantic comedy films
American romantic comedy films
Vestron Pictures films
1980s English-language films
1980s American films